The Khalafiyya Shia (named for its founder Khalaf ibn Abd al-Samad) were a subsect of the Zaidi branch of Shia Islam.

Beliefs
The Khalafiyya Shia had the following beliefs:
They believed that the Imams after Zayd ibn Ali ibn Husayn ibn Ali ibn Abī Ṭālib are as follows (in chronological order):
Abd al-Samad (a client of Zayd ibn Ali, although the Khalafiyya Shia claim he was a son of Zayd), then
Khalaf ibn Abd al-Samad (who fled from the Umayyads to the land of the Turks), then 
Muhammad ibn Khalaf ibn Abd al-Samad, then 
Ahmad ibn Muhammad ibn Khalaf ibn Abd al-Samad, then 
The Khalafiyya Shia did not know the names of the Imams after Ahmad, but they believed that a descendant of Ahmad, still residing in the land of the Turks (since the migration to that land of his ancestor Khalaf ibn Abd al-Samad), would rise as the Mahdi. 
They believed the Imam’s knowledge comes to him by inspiration, not by acquisition.
They believed the Imam understood all languages. 
They believed that Khalaf ibn Abd al-Samad left behind a book which he composed in letters of an alphabet unknown to anyone other than his successor Imams and that these Imams alone would be able to explain his book. 
They believed in a doctrine of Tawhid (Oneness of God) which denies that a person can describe or characterize God in any way. For example:
a person cannot say that God is knowing, or that God is not knowing. 
a person cannot say that God is powerful, or that God is not powerful. 
a person cannot say that God is a thing, or that God is not a thing. 
They also believed in a devotion to fives. For example (according to them):
5 primary angels; Mikha’il (the chief angel of the Khalafiyya), Jibra’il, Izra’il, Mika’il and Israfil
5 chosen creatures on Earth; Muhammad, Ali, Fatimah, Hasan ibn Ali and Husayn ibn Ali 
5 fingers
5 pillars of Islam; Shahadah, Salat, Zakat, Sawm and Hajj 
5 senses; hearing, sight, touch, smell, and taste 
5 prayer times; Fajr (Dawn prayer), Dhuhr (Mid-day prayer), Asr (Afternoon prayer), Maghrib (Sunset prayer) and Isha'a (Night prayer) 
5 books of scripture; the Suhuf Ibrahim (commonly the Scrolls of Abraham), the Tawrat (Torah), the Zabur (commonly the Psalms), the Injil (commonly the Gospel), and the Qur'an
5 things leading to salvation
5 special months of the year; Muharram, Rajab, Ramadan, Dhu al-Qi'dah and Dhu al-Hijjah

See also
Islamic schools and branches
List of extinct Shia sects

References

Bibliography
Mediaeval Isma'ili History and Thought, By Farhad Daftary, pg.173-74

Zaidiyyah
Shia Islamic branches
Schisms in Islam